Heinz Lindner (born 17 July 1990) is an Austrian professional footballer who plays as a goalkeeper for Swiss Super League club Sion and the Austria national team.

Club career
Lindner started his career with the reserve team for Austria Wien where he made 32 appearances. He then went on to make 187 first team appearances. In January 2015, Lindner was about to transfer to La Liga club Córdoba, but the move fell through. Lindner instead agreed a transfer with German club Eintracht Frankfurt. He played in Frankfurt for two seasons. For two seasons he played in the Swiss Super League for Grasshopper Club, but following their relegation he moved on to Wehen Wiesbaden.

On 8 September 2020, FC Basel announced that they had signed Lindner on a three year contract. Lindner joined Basel's first team for their 2020–21 season under head coach Ciriaco Sforza. Originally signed as backup goalkeeper, Lindner played his domestic league debut for the club in the home game in the Stadion Wankdorf on 21 November as Basel were defeated 1–2 by Young Boys. Lindner then established himself as first choice goalkeeper. He stayed with the club for two seasons and then moved on. During his period with the club Lindner played a total of 90 games for Basel. 67 of these games were in the Swiss Super League, 14 in the UEFA Europa Conference League and 9 were friendly games.

On 26 June 2022, Lindner signed with Sion.

International career
Lindner made his debut for the senior national team on 1 June 2012, in a 3–2 win over Ukraine in a friendly match.

He represented the national team at 2016 UEFA Euro.

Career statistics

Club

International

References

1990 births
Living people
Austrian footballers
Austrian expatriate footballers
Association football goalkeepers
Austria international footballers
UEFA Euro 2016 players
FK Austria Wien players
Eintracht Frankfurt players
Grasshopper Club Zürich players
SV Wehen Wiesbaden players
FC Basel players
FC Sion players
Austrian Football Bundesliga players
Bundesliga players
2. Bundesliga players
Swiss Super League players
Austrian expatriate sportspeople in Germany
Austrian expatriate sportspeople in Switzerland
Expatriate footballers in Germany
Expatriate footballers in Switzerland
Footballers from Linz